The 1908 Calgary municipal election was held on December 14, 1908 to elect a Mayor and twelve Aldermen to sit on the twenty-fifth Calgary City Council from January 2, 1909 to January 3, 1910.

Background
The election was held under multiple non-transferable vote where each elector was able to cast a ballot for the mayor and up to three ballots for separate councillors with a voter's designated ward.

Results

Mayor

Councillors

Ward 1

Ward 2

Ward 3

Ward 4

By-elections
Ward 1 Alderman Alfred Moodie suffered a heart attack on January 30, 1909, and died later that day at the age of 42. James Abel Hornby was acclaimed at the close of nominations as the Alderman for Ward 1 on February 17, 1909.

Ward 2 Alderman William Henry Manarey resigned effective July 2, 1909 after his appointment as license inspector for the City of Calgary. James Stuart Mackie was elected on the July 22, 1909 by-election, defeating J. Smalley 169 to 134.

See also
List of Calgary municipal elections

References

Municipal elections in Calgary
1908 elections in Canada
1900s in Calgary